Overview of Abroad  ( Khopani Tesutyun) was an Armenian comedy drama television series. The series premiered on Shant TV on April 11, 2015.
The series took place in Yerevan, Armenia.

Series overview

Cast and characters

Hayk Petrosyan portrays Rubik (seasons 1– 2) Single boy, sister of Asha, son of Mareta
Ani Malyan portrays Syuzi (Seasons 1- 2) Sister of Tina, daughter of Anna
Anahit Kirakosyan portrays Hayarpi (Seasons 1- 2) Relative from village, who has come to Yerevan for studying
Anais Sardaryan portrays Tina (seasons 1- 2) Daughter of Anna, sister of Syuzi
Hakob Qishmiryan portrays Ashot (Second part of seasons 1) Husband of Asha
Manana Gevorgyan portrays Asha  (Seasons 1- 2) Wife of Ashot, sister of Rubik and daughter of Mareta
Arshaluys Avetisyan portrays Eva (Seasons 1- 2) Grandmother of Rubik, Syuzi, Tina and Asha, mother of Saqo and Suro
Zara Sahakyan portrays Marieta "Sirun Mareta" (Seasons 1- present) Mother of Rubik and Asha, wife of Saqo
Ani Petrosyan portrays Anna (Seasons 1- 2) Mother of Tina and Syuzi, wife of Suro
Andranik Harutyunyan portrays Suro (Seasons 2) Father of Tina and Syuzi, husband of Anna, son of Eva
Iveta Edigaryan portrays Stella (Seasons 2) Neighbour
Kseniya Enyutina portrays Yulya (First part of seasons 1) Russian speaking ex-wife of Saqo
Saqo (Seasons 1-2, Voice only) Husband of Marieta, father of Rubik and Asha, brother of Suro, son of Eva
- portrays Leonid (Seasons 1- 2, Recurring) Love interest of Eva
- portrays Michael (Seasons 1- 2, Guest) Brother of Hayarpi

References

External links
 
 Khopani Tesutyun on Armserial
 Khopani Tesutyun on ArmFilm
 Khopani Tesutyun on Kargin-hayer

Armenian comedy television series
Armenian-language television shows
Shant TV original programming
2015 Armenian television series debuts
2010s Armenian television series